Ambreen Salahuddin is a Pakistani poet and author. She is the granddaughter of Muhammad Munawwar Mirza. Her father Salahuddin Ayyubi is a religious scholar and author of books on religious studies, Iqbal, Qur'anic terminology and interpretations. Her husband, Sajjad Bloch is a prominent poet of Ghazal genre of Urdu Poetry with an esteemed collection of ghazals titled as Hijrat-o-Hijr.

Ambreen Salahuddin is the author of five books. Her first book of Urdu poetry was published in 2004 titled as "Sar-e-Dasht-e-GumaaN" and second book of Urdu poetry was published in 2014, titled as "Sadyon Jaise Pal". The second edition of "Sadyon Jaise Pal" is published by Sang-e-Meel publications in 2019. Her other books include a research work "Feminism in modern Urdu poetesses" (2005), a companion of Gender Studies in Urdu "Farhang-e-Sinfi Mutaleyat" (2018) and translation of Richard Dawkins's The Magic of Reality, "Haqeeqat ka Jadu" (2018).

Ambreen Salahuddin has a PhD in Gender Studies from Department of Gender Studies at the University of the Punjab. She is an assistant professor at University of Management and Technology, Lahore.

Books 
Ambreen Salahuddin has authored five books. Ambreen Salahuddin has two books of Urdu poetry to her credit. 
Her first book, "Sar-e-Dasht-e-GumaaN" appeared in 2004, published by Al-hamd Publications, Lahore and second edition of the book came in the year 2011, published by Multi-media Affairs. The book was awarded "PEN Pakistan First Book Award", by PEN Pakistan Center in category of poetry, for the years 2004 and 2005.

Ambreen Salahuddin's second book of Urdu poetry, Sadyon Jaise Pal, was published in 2014.

Ambreen Salahuddin's third book is her research work titled Feminism in Modern Urdu Poetesses was published in the year 2005 by West Pakistan Urdu Academy. The book discusses Urdu women poets from 1857 to 2000. Poets included in the book are Ze Khe Sheen, Ada Jafri, Kishwar Naheed, Fahmida Riaz, Zehra Nigah, Yasmeen Hameed, Parveen Shakir and others.

Ambreen Salahuddin's fourth book 'Farhang-e-Sinfi Mutaleyat' was published in 2018. Farhang e Sinfi Mutaleyat' by Ambreen Salahuddin is a companion of gender studies in Urdu published by Urdu Science Board. In compiling this book, the prime focus was to make readers acquainted with important terms and turning points in the history of women's emancipation movements. The book has five sections. The first section contains relevant articles from constitution of Pakistan, women related legislation and a brief introduction to governmental institutions for gender parity and women rights. The second section includes universal declarations, conventions and conferences. The third section brings an introduction to international and national organizations working for human rights and women's rights. The fourth section contains terminology related to gender studies and feminism. The fifth section gives introduction to notable names of feminist and human rights movements, comprising three separate sections on global, South Asian and Pakistani thinkers, feminists and empowered women. Another feature that makes this book a reliable resource is that it includes citations and references from credible research in proper APA format.

Ambreen Salahuddin's fifth book is the translation of Dawkin's Magic of Reality in Urdu. It is titled as "Haqeeqat ka Jadu" and is published by Urdu Science Board Pakistan in 2018.

The second edition of Ambreen Salahuddin's second book of poetry, "Sadyon Jaise Pal" was published in 2019 by Sang-e-Meel Publications.

Education 
Dr Ambreen Salahuddin has a PhD in gender studies from the University of the Punjab (2017). Her area of research is gender and literature. Previously, she did her MA in Philosophy and MA in History from the University of the Punjab, Lahore. She did her graduation from LCWU in Philosophy and English literature before that. Later she enrolled in M Phil leading to PhD in gender studies at the Institute of Social and Cultural Studies, University of the Punjab and completed her PhD in 2017.

She has published her research in credible journals of research. 
Some of her research articles are;

 "Threshold: A Spatial and Ideological Barrier in South Asian Fiction - A Case study of Pakistani Women Fiction Writers", 
 "Beyond the Threshold: Emancipation or Entrapment? The Feminine Archetypes in Pakistani Women Fiction Writers", 
 "Usage of Religious Symbols in Fiction by Pakistani Women Writers".

References

External links 
 https://ssh.umt.edu.pk/gs/Academics/Faculty/Dr-Ambreen-Salah-Ud-Din.aspx
 http://pu.edu.pk/images/journal/csas/PDF/12%20Ambreen%20Salahudeen_v31_no1_jan-jun2016.pdf
 http://pu.edu.pk/images/journal/english/PDF/02_vLIII_Jan_17.pdf
 https://www.umt.edu.pk/jitc/Current-Issue-(Spring-2018).aspx
 https://admin.umt.edu.pk/Media/Site/UMT/SubSites/jitc/FileManager/Spring%202018/6-%20Ambreen%20Salahuddin%20QR.pdf
 http://pakistan360degrees.com/tag/ambreen-salahuddin/ 
 https://web.facebook.com/ambreensalahuddin
 https://twitter.com/AmbreenS_poet

21st-century Pakistani poets
Pakistani writers
Living people
Year of birth missing (living people)
21st-century Pakistani women writers
University of the Punjab alumni
Lahore College for Women University alumni
Gender studies academics